The Mittlerer Sonnblick is a 3,000 metre high sub-peak of the Großer Sonnblick (3,030 m) to which it is linked by a knife-edge ridge. It is a border peak between the two Austrian federal states of Carinthia and Salzburg. It lies within the Ankogel Group of mountains, a sub-group of the High Tauern.

The mountain has a prominence of 100 metres and an isolation of 660 metres.

The peak has achieved certain renown, no doubt because it is the easternmost three-thousander in the Alps. It is certainly not wrong to say that the Großer Sonnblick is the easternmost mountain in the Alps that exceeds the 3,000-metre mark, but it is not the easternmost point in the Alps that reaches that height.

References 

Mountains of Carinthia (state)
Mountains of Salzburg (state)
Mountains of the Alps
Alpine three-thousanders
Ankogel Group